Bob Quinn (born 1976) is an American football executive who is a senior executive consultant for the Cleveland Browns of the National Football League (NFL). He previously served as the general manager of the Detroit Lions from 2016 to 2020.  Quinn began his career with the New England Patriots as a player personnel assistant in 2000 and spent 16 seasons serving in various executive roles within the Patriot organization.

Early life
After graduating from Norwood High School in Norwood, Massachusetts in 1994, Quinn attended the University of Connecticut, earning a Bachelor's Degree in political science in 1998, and earning his Master's Degree in sports management in 2000. He was a graduate assistant for Connecticut in 1998 and 1999.

Executive career

New England Patriots
Quinn joined the New England Patriots in 2000 as a player personnel assistant, spending two seasons in that position. He spent another two seasons as a pro scout, four seasons as a regional scout, and one season as a national scout before being promoted to assistant director of pro personnel in 2009. Quinn was promoted to Director of Pro Scouting in May 2012.

Detroit Lions
On January 8, 2016, the Detroit Lions hired Quinn as general manager.

After 2 seasons of being the GM, Quinn fired Jim Caldwell on January 1, 2018. Quinn fired Caldwell due to the team's 9–7 record that season, which was “not good enough” according to Quinn. This drew some criticism with the fans, as Caldwell's record with the Lions (36-28 with 2 playoff appearances) and overall win percentage (.563) was the best the Lions had since the merger.

On February 5, 2018, Quinn named Matt Patricia the head coach, who led the Lions to a 6–10 record his first year.

On November 28, 2020, Quinn along with head coach Matt Patricia were fired by the Lions. Quinn finished his tenure with the Lions with a  record.

Cleveland Browns
On July 30, 2021, Quinn was hired by the Cleveland Browns to be a senior consultant in their football operations department under general manager Andrew Berry.

References

1976 births
Living people
Cleveland Browns executives
Detroit Lions executives
New England Patriots executives
New England Patriots scouts
People from Norwood, Massachusetts
University of Connecticut alumni
UConn Huskies football coaches